Davey Point is a conspicuous rocky headland  south-west of Round Point on the north coast of King George Island, in the South Shetland Islands of Antarctica.

History
This feature was charted and named Round Island by Discovery Investigations personnel on the Discovery II in 1935, but air photos now show that it is not an island but a rocky point. Since there is already a Round Point on King George Island, a new name was substituted by the UK Antarctic Place-Names Committee in 1960. Davey Point is named for Graham J. Davey, a Falkland Islands Dependencies Survey assistant surveyor at Admiralty Bay in 1957 and 1958, who triangulated King George Island and extended this triangulation to Nelson Island, Robert Island and Greenwich Island.

References 

 

Headlands of King George Island (South Shetland Islands)